The Colonial Conference is an athletic conference consisting of public high schools located in Camden County and Gloucester County, New Jersey, United States. The Colonial Conference operates under the aegis of the New Jersey State Interscholastic Athletic Association. It was first established in 1945, and today it is composed of two divisions: Patriot and Liberty.

History
For the 2020-21 school year, Overbrook High School returned to the Tri-County Conference, after being a member of the Colonial Conference from 2008 to 2020.  Gloucester City Junior-Senior High School left the Tri-County Conference and took the spot left vacant by Overbrook.

Participating schools

References

External links 

NJSIAA
South Jersey Sports high school list

Camden County, New Jersey
Sports in Gloucester County, New Jersey
New Jersey high school athletic conferences
Sports organizations established in 1945
1945 establishments in New Jersey